Carex spissa is a species of sedge known by the common name San Diego sedge. It is native to the southwestern United States in California, Arizona, and New Mexico, and far northern Mexico. It grows in wet places such as seeps and streambanks, sometimes on serpentine soils. This sedge looks somewhat like a cattail. It produces angled stems easily exceeding a meter in height surrounded by leathery green to reddish leaves up to about 1.2 meters long. The inflorescence is up to 80 centimeters long, with many long reddish brown flower spikes, each holding up to 300 developing fruits.

References

External links
USDA Plants Profile for Carex spissa
Carex spissa — UC Photo gallery

spissa
Flora of Arizona
Flora of California
Natural history of the California chaparral and woodlands
Plants described in 1886